Irish Residential Properties REIT Plc or IRES is a multi-unit residential letting company and REIT focused on the Dublin property market and that of other major Irish urban centres. It is listed on Euronext Dublin and is a constituent member of the ISEQ 20 with a market capitalisation of €873m as of 31 January 2020. It has a secondary listing on the London Stock Exchange.

IRES was floated on the Irish Stock Exchange in April 2014 and was funded largely by the Canadian listed company CAP REIT. IRES continues to be externally managed by certain subsidiaries of CAP REIT.

IRES is Ireland's largest private landlord with over 3,884 units under its ownership as of January 2020.

After Hibernia REIT was taken over by Brookfield Asset Management in June 2022, IRES was the final Irish REIT to remain a publicly listed company.

Controversy
In July 2017, a number of politicians and political activists including Mick Wallace, Eoin Ó Broin and Clare Daly protested about escalating rents and the opening of a new development at the Maples in Sandyford outside the head offices of IRES in Grand Canal Dock, Dublin.

References

Real estate companies of Ireland
Irish companies established in 2014
Companies listed on Euronext Dublin
Companies based in Dublin (city)
Property companies of Ireland